Ocotepeque is one of the 18 departments of Honduras, Central America, located in the West and bordering both El Salvador and Guatemala. It was formed in 1906 from part of Copán department. The capital and main city is Nueva Ocotepeque.

The department covers a total surface area of 1,630 km² and, in 2015, had an estimated population of 151,516.

Municipalities

 Belén Gualcho
 Concepción
 Dolores Merendon
 Fraternidad
 La Encarnación
 La Labor
 Lucerna
 Mercedes
 Ocotepeque
 San Fernando
 San Francisco del Valle
 Santa Ifigenia
 San Jorge
 San Marcos
 Santa Fé
 Sensenti
 Sinuapa

References

 
Departments of Honduras
States and territories established in 1906
1906 establishments in Honduras